NIP30 protein is a protein that in humans is encoded by the FAM192A gene.

References

Further reading